Velikton Innokentyevich Barannikov (4 July 1938 – 29 November 2007) was a Soviet boxer who competed in the lightweight category at the 1960 and 1964 Summer Olympics. In 1960 he lost to Abel Laudonio in the quarter-final. In 1964 he progressed to the final, where he lost to Józef Grudzień. He won a European title in 1965, and finished his career with a record of 228 wins out of 275 bouts. Despite his international success he never won a national title, finishing in second place in 1960–62 and 1965.

Barannikov was born in Ulan-Ude, where he started training in boxing. In 1956 he moved to Moscow and graduated from the prestigious Bauman Moscow State Technical University. After retirement he worked as a boxing coach and referee, first in Moscow, then in Germany (ca. 1974), and after 1982 in Ulan-Ude. He was killed in a traffic incident on 29 November 2007. Barannikov was a retired lieutenant colonel.

1964 Olympic results
Below is the record of Velikton Barannikov, a lightweight boxer from the Soviet Union who competed at the 1964 Tokyo Olympics"

 Round of 64: bye
 Round of 32: defeated Luis Zuniga (Chile) by decision, 4-1
 Round of 16: defeated Adrian Blair (Australia) by decision, 5-0
 Quarterfinal: defeated Janos Kajdi (Hungary) referee stopped contest
 Semifinal: defeated Jim McCourt (Ireland) by decision, 3-2
 Final: lost to Jozef Grudzen (Poland) by decision, 0-5 (was awarded silver medal)

References

1938 births
2007 deaths
Soviet male boxers
Olympic boxers of the Soviet Union
Olympic silver medalists for the Soviet Union
Boxers at the 1960 Summer Olympics
Boxers at the 1964 Summer Olympics
Pedestrian road incident deaths
People from Ulan-Ude
Olympic medalists in boxing
Russian male boxers
Road incident deaths in Russia
Russian people of Buryat descent
Medalists at the 1964 Summer Olympics
Lightweight boxers
Sportspeople from Buryatia